The 2012 International German Open (also known as the bet–at–home Open – German Tennis Championships 2012 for sponsorship reasons) was a men's tennis tournament played on outdoor red clay courts. It was the 106th edition of the event known that year as the International German Open and was part of the ATP World Tour 500 series of the 2012 ATP World Tour. It took place at the Am Rothenbaum in Hamburg, Germany, from 16 July through 22 July 2012. Third-seeded Juan Mónaco won the singles title.

Singles main draw entrants

Seeds

 1 Rankings are as of July 9, 2012

Other entrants
The following players received wildcards into the singles main draw:
  Matthias Bachinger
  Tommy Haas 
  Julian Reister

The following players received entry from the qualifying draw:
  Federico Delbonis
  Marsel İlhan
  Daniel Muñoz de la Nava
  Horacio Zeballos

Doubles main draw entrants

Seeds

 Rankings are as of July 9, 2012

Other entrants
The following pairs received wildcards into the doubles main draw:
  Robin Kern /  Kevin Krawietz
  Tobias Kamke /  Julian Reister
The following pair received entry as alternates:
  Rogério Dutra da Silva /  Daniel Muñoz de la Nava

Withdrawals
  Oliver Marach (ankle injury)

Finals

Singles

 Juan Mónaco defeated  Tommy Haas, 7–5, 6–4

Doubles

 David Marrero /  Fernando Verdasco defeated  Rogerio Dutra da Silva /  Daniel Muñoz de la Nava, 6–4, 6–3

References

External links
  
   
 Association of Tennis Professionals (ATP) tournament profile

 
International German Open
Hamburg European Open
2012 in German tennis
July 2012 sports events in Germany